Mohamed Megherbi (born May 6, 1984 in Oran) is an Algerian football player. He currently plays for RC Relizane in the Algerian Ligue Professionnelle 2.

Club career
On December 30, 2009, Megherbi signed a -year contract with MC Alger, joining them on a transfer from ASM Oran. MC Alger paid a transfer fee of 5 million Algerian dinars for his services.
In June 2012, he returned to Oran and signed to MC Oran for two years.

Honours
 Won the Algerian Ligue Professionnelle 1 once with MC Alger in 2010

References

External links
 DZFoot Profile
 

1984 births
Living people
Footballers from Oran
Algerian footballers
Algerian Ligue Professionnelle 1 players
ASM Oran players
MC Alger players
MC Oran players
RC Relizane players
Association football defenders
21st-century Algerian people